Rineloricaria parva is a species of catfish in the family Loricariidae. It is native to South America, where it occurs in the Paraguay River basin in Argentina, Brazil, and Paraguay. The species reaches 11 cm (4.3 inches) in standard length and is believed to be a facultative air-breather.

Rineloricaria parva appears in the aquarium trade, where it is sometimes referred to as the common whiptail catfish.

References 

Loricariini
Fish described in 1895
Catfish of South America
Fish of Brazil